Assane N'Doye (born 25 January 1953) is a Senegalese judoka. He competed in the men's middleweight event at the 1976 Summer Olympics.

References

External links
 

1953 births
Living people
Senegalese male judoka
Olympic judoka of Senegal
Judoka at the 1976 Summer Olympics
Place of birth missing (living people)
20th-century Senegalese people
21st-century Senegalese people